Propaganda is a studio album by English guitarist, composer and improvisor Fred Frith. It comprises 21 pieces for dance written by Frith and commissioned by Matthew Maguire for the Creation Production Company. It was first performed at La Mama ETC in New York City in May 1987. The suite was recorded by Kramer at Noise New York in April 1987 and released on Side 4 of the LP release of Frith's 1988 solo album, The Technology of Tears. It was omitted from the CD releases of the album.

The Propaganda suite was reworked and remastered in February 2015 by Myles Boisen, and was released by Fred Records in November 2015.

Track listing
All tracks composed by Fred Frith.

Sources: AllMusic, Discogs, SquidCo

Personnel
Fred Frith – all instruments, voice

Sources: Discogs, SquidCo

Sound and artwork
Recorded at Noise New York, April 1987; Mastered at Headless Buddhna Mastering Labs, Oakland, California, February 2015.
Kramer – recording engineer (1987)
Myles Boisen – remastering (2015)
Fred Frith – producer
Nancy Campbell – photography
Tom Kurth – cover design

Source: Discogs

References

2015 albums
Fred Frith albums
Fred Records albums
Albums produced by Fred Frith